Magon was one of six s built for the French Navy during the 1910s.

Construction and design
Magon was laid down at the Nantes shipyard of Ateliers et Chantiers de Bretagne in 1911 as one of six s  ordered for the French Navy under the 1910 and 1911 construction programmes as a follow-on to the earlier  "800-tonne" destroyers. She was launched on 19 April 1913 and was completed in 1914.

The machinery powering the ships differed in detail between the ships of the class. Four funnels were fitted. Magon reached a speed of  during sea trials, and was the fastest of her class, although operational sea speeds were lower.

Armament consisted of two  Modèle 1893 guns, four  Modèle 1902 guns and four 450mm (17.7 in) torpedo tubes in two twin mounts. This was modified during the First World War by the addition of a 47 mm or 75 mm anti-aircraft gun, two machineguns and provision for up to ten depth charges. The ship had a crew of 5–7 officers and 75–77 other ranks.

Service

First World War

Mediterranean
On 23 May 1915, Italy declared war on Austro-Hungary, and Magon was one of 12 French destroyers deployed in support of the Italian Fleet, operating out of Brindisi. She was deployed on patrols aimed at stopping Austro-Hungarian surface ships and submarines from passing through the Straits of Otranto. On 8 June, Magon was part of the escort (consisting of four Italian and three French destroyers) for the British light cruiser  on a patrol off the Albanian coast intended to destroy Austro-Hungarian light naval forces. Despite the strong escort, the Austro-Hungarian submarine  managed to torpedo Dublin, killing 13 of the British cruiser's crew, but the escort managed to drive away several more suspected submarine attacks, and Dublin successfully reached Brindisi without further damage.

On 12 July, Magon and sister ship  raided the island of Lastovo off the Austrian coast of the Adriatic (now part of Croatia), destroying oil stores and the telegraph station. This attack was simultaneous with the Italian occupation of Palagruža. She remained based at Brindisi in September 1915, but on 6 December was recorded as being at Nantes.

Dunkirk flotilla
From December 1916 Magon served in the Dunkirk flotilla, operating in the English Channel and Dover Straits.

References

Bibliography

 

 

 

Bisson-class destroyers
Ships built in France
1913 ships